Otter River State Forest is a publicly owned forest and recreational preserve located in the towns of Templeton, Winchendon, and Royalston in Massachusetts managed by the Massachusetts Department of Conservation and Recreation. The state forest encompasses the land surrounding the junction of the Otter and Millers rivers. Habitats include freshwater marsh, northern hardwood stands, and pine groves planted by the Civilian Conservation Corps to reforest former farmlands.

History
The forest was the first property acquired by the State Forest Commission in 1915; it was formally established in 1917. A 100-year birthday celebration was held on the forest grounds in August 2015.

The Civilian Conservation Corps was active in the forest during the 1930s. The Corps' handiwork can be seen in the dam at the northern end of Beaman Pond and the visitor contact station on the east side of the pond. The pond's Corps-built stone bathhouse no longer exists.

Activities and amenities
Day-use area: The developed portion of the forest is accessed from Winchendon Road (Rt 202) on the north side of the village of Baldwinville. Facilities centered on Beaman Pond include a swimming beach, ballfield, picnicking areas, and pavilion. Handicapped-accessible facilities include restrooms and showers.
Trails: The extensive trail system is used for walking, hiking, mountain biking, cross-country skiing, snowmobiling and dog-sledding.
Camping: There are 85 seasonal campsites, including yurts.
The forest also offers fishing, restricted hunting, and interpretive programs.
The camping club that formed at Otter River State Forest as the New England Campers Association in 1957 and known today as the North American Family Campers Association maintains a brick garden to remember members and chapters. A garden bench is dedicated to former NAFCA President, Roger Swallow (1941-2007).

References

External links
Otter River State Forest Department of Conservation and Recreation
Otter River State Forest Map Department of Conservation and Recreation

Massachusetts state forests
Protected areas of Worcester County, Massachusetts
Civilian Conservation Corps in Massachusetts
Campgrounds in Massachusetts
Protected areas established in 1915
1915 establishments in Massachusetts